Abispa splendida (also known as the large mud-nesting wasp or velvety black and yellow) is a species of wasp in the Vespidae family.

Subspecies
Abispa splendida australis (Smith, 1857)
Abispa splendida maculicollis Cameron, 1911
Abispa splendida odyneroides Perkins, 1912
Abispa splendida splendida (Guérin, 1838)

Description
Body is black and orange-yellow coloured. Thorax is black with yellow shoulders. Head, antenna and legs are yellow. The abdomen shows yellow and black segments. Wings are orange.

Behavior
These wasps build their mud nest under rocks or inside holes in trees. Larvae pupate in their pot. The adults emerge from the nest after three month.

Distribution
This species can be found in Australia and Indonesia.

References

Insects described in 1838
Potter wasps
Insects of Indonesia